Cyclooctadeca-1,3,5,7,9,11,13,15,17-nonayne or cyclo[18]carbon is an allotrope of carbon with molecular formula .  The molecule is a ring of eighteen carbon atoms, connected by alternating triple and single bonds; thus, it is a polyyne and a cyclocarbon.

Cyclo[18]carbon is the smallest cyclo[n]carbon predicted to be thermodynamically stable, with a computed strain energy of 72 kilocalories per mole. Above 122K, it explosively decomposes to amorphous graphite.

A collaboration of teams at IBM and the University of Oxford team claimed to synthesize it in solid state in 2019 by electrochemical decarbonylation of several sites of a cyclobutanone structure: Later, researchers from Spain have used computational techniques to probe the structural and electronic properties of the molecule, and have discovered it to be an electron acceptor.

According to these IBM researchers, the electronic structure of their product consists of alternating triple bonds and single bonds, rather than a cumulene-type structure of consecutive double bonds. This supposedly makes this molecule a semiconductor.

References 

Aromatic compounds
Group IV semiconductors
Polyynes
Cyclocarbons
Substances discovered in the 2010s